Ikuna (Ikuka) is a town and ward in Njombe Rural District in the Njombe Region of the Tanzanian Southern Highlands. In 2016 the Tanzania National Bureau of Statistics report there were 9,474 people in the ward, from 9,178 in 2012.

References

Wards of Njombe Region